We Must Become the Change We Want to See is the first live DVD from The Sound of Animals Fighting, released on May 1, 2007. The DVD includes footage from one of the only four shows the band has played . The show was filmed live at the House of Blues in Anaheim, California on August 27, 2006. The name "We Must Become the Change We Want to See" is taken from a Mahatma Gandhi quote.

Throughout the set, Fritz Lang's 1927 film Metropolis is projected behind the band.

Track listing
"The Heretic (a cappella)"
"Act I: Chasing Suns"
"Act II: All is Ash or the Light Shining Through It"
"Act III: Modulate Back to the Tonic"
"Un'aria"
"Skullflower"
"My Horse Must Lose"
"Horses in the Sky"
"Stockhausen, es ist Ihr Gehirn, das ich Suche"
"This Heat"
"Act IV: You Don't Need A Witness"

The cast

Featuring

Bradley Bell from Chiodos is the only musician that is not given an animal name (this may be because he never appeared on any of the studio recordings), he also is wearing a mask and is completely cloaked in black as he performs

2007 films
The Sound of Animals Fighting video albums
Equal Vision Records video albums
Works based on Metropolis (1927 film)